Municipal elections were held in Bosnia and Herzegovina on 5 October 2008. Parties and independent candidates had to register by 23 May 2008, party or coalition lists by 25 June 2008. These were the first local elections were representatives of minorities were elected to the municipal assemblies.

64 political parties and 183 independent candidates were certified to stand in the election.

Nationalist parties (the Party of Democratic Action and the Croatian Democratic Union of Bosnia and Herzegovina in the federation and the Alliance of Independent Social Democrats in the RS) were the most successful in the election, while the Party for Bosnia and Herzegovina was considered to have been the loser of the election. Turnout was 55% (an increase and more than expected), but only 40% in the cities, were the voters were the most supportive of smaller, multi-ethnic parties.

Federation of Bosnia and Herzegovina

Republika Srpska

Assembly of Brčko District

References

Elections in Bosnia and Herzegovina
2008 elections in Europe
Municipal
Municipal elections in Bosnia and Herzegovina
October 2008 events in Europe